Ed Moses (April 9, 1926 – January 17, 2018) was an American artist based in Los Angeles and a central figure of postwar West Coast art.

Moses first exhibited at the Ferus Gallery in 1957 and became widely known over the next five decades.

Early life and education 
Moses was born in Long Beach, California to Olivia Branco and Alphonse Lemuel Moses on April 9, 1926.

Moses enlisted in the U.S. Navy at age 17, serving in the Navy Medical Corps as a scrub assistant during World War II. Moses subsequently enrolled in a pre-med program at Long Beach City College. When he was not accepted into medical school, he enrolled in art classes with Pedro Miller, a graduate from the Art Institute of Chicago.  In 1949, he left Long Beach City College, transferring to UCLA and subsequently the University of Oregon.  He left school, worked odd jobs before re-enrolling at UCLA in 1953, where he became friends with Craig Kauffman and Walter Hopps. To complete his master's degree, Moses held his graduate show at the Ferus Gallery, rather than on his college campus.

In 1958 Moses moved to New York City, where he met Willem de Kooning, Franz Kline, Mark Rothko and Milton Resnick. In 1960 he returned to California.

In 1959, Moses married Avilda Peters; and moved to the state of Virginia, followed by San Francisco and again to Los Angeles.

Art career and later life
In the 1950s and 1960s, Moses was part a group of artists named the Cool School, composed of Ed Ruscha, Robert Irwin, Larry Bell, Edward Kienholz, John Altoon, Ken Price and Billy Al Bengston.

Moses joined the art faculty in 1968 at the new University of California campus at Irvine, where he would stay until 1972. In 1980, he received a Guggenheim Fellowship. Moses began working with Peter Goulds at L.A. Louver. He remained with Goulds for the next 15 years.

In 1991, he took part in the Whitney Biennial.

In 1996, Moses' paintings were documented in a major retrospective exhibition at MOCA (Museum of Contemporary Art), Los Angeles.

Moses died at his home in Venice, California, at the age of 91.

Public collections 
Albright-Knox Gallery, Buffalo, NY
Art Institute of Chicago, Chicago, IL
Berkeley Art Museum, University of California, Berkeley, CA
Cincinnati Museum of Art, Cincinnati, OH
Corcoran Gallery of Art, Washington, DC
Dallas Museum of Art
Dartmouth College Gallery, Hanover, NH
Denver Art Museum, Denver, CO
CU Art Museum, University of Colorado Boulder, CO
Hammer Museum, Los Angeles, CA
Hirshhorn Museum and Sculpture Garden, Washington, DC
Irvine Collection, Irvine, CA
Janss Foundation, Thousand Oaks, CA
Lannan Foundation, Santa Fe, NM
Long Beach Museum of Art, Long Beach, CA
Los Angeles County Museum of Art, Los Angeles, CA
Lowe Art Museum, University of Miami, Miami, FL
Menil Foundation, Rice University Art Gallery Houston, TX
Minneapolis Institute of Art
Musee national d'art moderne – Centre Georges Pompidou, Paris, France
Museum of Contemporary Art, Los Angeles, CA
Museum of Contemporary Art San Diego, La Jolla, CA
Museum of Fine Arts Houston
Museum of Modern Art, New York, NY
National Gallery of Art
Smithsonian American Art Museum, Washington, DC
Neuberger Museum of Art, Purchase, NY
New Mexico Museum of Art, Santa Fe, NM
Norton Simon Museum, Pasadena, CA
Oakland Museum of California, Oakland, CA
Orange County Museum of Art, Newport Beach, CA
Palm Springs Desert Museum, Palm Springs, CA
Philadelphia Museum of Art, Philadelphia, PA
Prudential Insurance Company, Newark, NJ
San Francisco Museum of Modern Art, San Francisco, CA
Seattle Museum of Art, Seattle, WA
Spencer Museum of Art, University of Kansas, Lawrence, KS
The Broad Art Foundation, Santa Monica, CA
Walker Art Center, Minneapolis, MN
Frederick R. Weisman Art Foundation, Los Angeles, CA
Whitney Museum of American Art, New York, NY
Yale University Art Gallery, New Haven, CT

Awards 
1996 – Honorary Ph.D., Otis Art Institute, Los Angeles, CA 
1993 – Long Beach City College Hall of Fame Inductee
1980 – Guggenheim Fellowship
1976 – National Endowment for the Arts Fellowship Grant

References

Further reading 

1926 births
2018 deaths
American contemporary painters
Modern artists
Artists from Los Angeles
20th-century American painters
21st-century American painters